An Ode is the third studio album by South Korean boy band Seventeen. It was released on September 16, 2019, through Pledis Entertainment. The album spawned two singles, "Hit" was released as the album's lead single on August 5, 2019, followed by the title track, "Fear", on the release date of the album.

An Ode was a commercial success, debuted atop the South Korean Gaon Album Chart, and topped the Japanese Oricon Albums Chart in its third week. It also reached number seven on the US Billboard World Albums chart. An Ode sold 822,265 copies in South Korea in September 2019 (including 26,131 copies of the Kihno edition).

Background and release 

On August 5, the single, "Hit" was released with a music video, prior to the rest of the album.

An Ode was released on September 16, 2019, with 5 physical album versions: "Begin", "The Poet", "Hope", "Truth" and "Real". The album also includes a Korean language version of their Japanese single, "Happy Ending". The Japanese single had been previously released on May 29. In contrast to their previous uplifting music style, An Ode showcased a different side of Seventeen, with a more darker concept.

The album was supported by the Ode to You tour, which kicked off on October 8 and was scheduled to have performances in several countries in Europe, Asia, and North America. However, due to the COVID-19 pandemic, the remaining stops of the tour were cancelled in February 2020.

Track listing

Charts

Weekly charts

Year-end charts

Certifications and sales

Accolades

References

2019 albums
Seventeen (South Korean band) albums
Korean-language albums
Hybe Corporation albums